Moniteau Township is an inactive township in Howard County, in the U.S. state of Missouri.

Moniteau Township was erected in 1821, taking its name from Moniteau Creek.

References

Townships in Missouri
Townships in Howard County, Missouri